Carmen Morla Lynch (1887–1983), also known as Carmen Morla de Maira, was a Chilean feminist writer. Her brother  was a diplomat, writer, and journalist. She was the great-aunt of writer Elizabeth Subercaseaux.

Work
Part of her literary output is known to be unpublished or scattered in newspapers and magazines – as is also the case with other feminist writers of the era such as her mother and sister, María Luisa Fernández, and Sara Hübner de Fresno. Some of her unpublished work appears in the 2001 book La belle époque chilena: alta sociedad y mujeres de élite en el cambio de siglo by historian . Her literary contributions are considered to be part of the early 20th century avant-garde that sought to massify feminist thinking and fight for women's rights.

For some authors, her work can be framed within so-called "aristocratic feminism", along with other writers such as Elvira Santa Cruz Ossa, Blanca Santa Cruz Ossa, Inés Echeverría Bello, María Mercedes Vial, Teresa Wilms Montt, María Luisa Fernández, and Mariana Cox Méndez.

The spiritism sessions that she held with her sister Ximena in the early 20th century have inspired plays and novels.

References

1887 births
1983 deaths
20th-century Chilean women writers
20th-century Chilean non-fiction writers
Chilean people of Irish descent
Chilean feminist writers
Chilean expatriates in France